Paradzai Willings Zimondi (Paradzai Willings Zimonte) (4 March 1947 – 22 January 2021) was a Zimbabwean independence activist and military officer. Zimondi was considered a hero of the Zimbabwean struggle for independence, and he later attained the rank of major general in the Zimbabwean army. After his military retirement, he served for twenty-two years as the Prisons and Corrections Services Commissioner-General for Zimbabwe.

Career
During the liberation struggle Zimondi took the nom de guerre of Comrade Tonderai Nyika. In 1974 he received his initial ZANLA training at Mgagao Training Camp in Tanzania, after which he was sent as a trainer to Chimoio in western Mozambique. He rose to become the provincial commander in Manica Province, where he led the ZANLA forces to major successes in the battles of he Ruda, Gandayi, the attack on Umtali (Mutare), Mavhonde (Mavonde) and Grand Reef.  The battles of Mavhonde and Grand Reef were decisive in breaking the  spirit of the Rhodesian Army.

At the end of the liberation struggle Zimondi was the military governor of the ZANLA occupied areas of Manica Province of Mozambique and adjacent areas in Manicaland Province of Zimbabwe.

In 1981, he was attested into the Zimbabwe National Army as a colonel and was subsequently promoted to major general. Among his military posts was Commander of the Presidential Guard.

In 1997, Zimondi joined the Zimbabwe Prison Services as a Deputy Commissioner, where he undertook to propose reforms after studying the British, Danish and Swedish prison systems. Among his accomplishments as director he significantly improved health services for prisoners, and expanded the number of prison farms from sixteen to twenty-four. Zimondi retired from the Prison Service effective 1 November 2020.

He was placed on sanctions lists by the European Union in 2002 and the United States in 2003. He remained on the lists until his death.

Personal life
Zimondi was born in 1947 to Charles Zimondi and Abigail  Karimazondo Zimondi in the Uzumba District of Mashonaland East Province. He attended Nyamuzuwe High School in Mutoko, but left to become a freedom fighter in the Zimbabwe African National Liberation Army (ZANLA).

He married Annie Flora Imagine Chairuka, and had two children.

Zimondi died of COVID-19 during the COVID-19 pandemic in Zimbabwe and was buried in the cemetery at the National Heroes Acre.

Notes and references

1947 births
2021 deaths
Deaths from the COVID-19 pandemic in Zimbabwe
People from Uzumba District
Zimbabwe African National Liberation Army personnel
Zimbabwean generals